John Abraham Lohr (born 1961) is a Canadian politician, who was elected to the Nova Scotia House of Assembly in the 2013 provincial election. A member of the Progressive Conservative Party of Nova Scotia, he represents the electoral district of Kings North.

Early life
Lohr was born in Nova Scotia to first-generation Dutch immigrants who arrived in Canada at Halifax's Pier 21 in 1958.

Business career
In 1987, Lohr purchased his father's farm and developed it into a multi-faceted agri-business which grew numerous fruits and vegetables. In 1999, Lohr purchased and rebranded a spice processing company, Farmer John's Herbs and in 2017, he sold the farm and the spice company to his two oldest sons.

Political career
Lohr was elected to the Nova Scotia House of Assembly in the 2013 provincial election. He was re-elected in the 2017 provincial election and again in the 2021 election.

On January 8, 2018, Lohr announced his candidacy for the  leadership of the Progressive Conservative Party of Nova Scotia. He finished in third place.

On August 31, 2021, Lohr was made the Minister of Municipal Affairs and Housing, as well as Minister responsible for the Emergency Management Office and Military Relations.

Electoral record

 

 

|-

|Progressive Conservative
|John Lohr
|align="right"|2903
|align="right"|32.49
|align="right"|
|-

|New Democrat
|Jim Morton
|align="right"|2882
|align="right"|32.26
|align="right"|
|-

|Liberal
|Stephen Wayne Pearl
|align="right"|2787
|align="right"|30.99
|align="right"|
|}

References

1961 births
Living people
Progressive Conservative Association of Nova Scotia MLAs
Members of the Executive Council of Nova Scotia
People from Kings County, Nova Scotia
21st-century Canadian politicians